The JD-03 pipe is a kimberlite diatreme in Nunavut, Canada, located  from the Jericho Diamond Mine. It was discovered in 1996 and is interpreted to be pyroclastic with intense serpentinization.

The JD-03 pipe formed by an explosive eruption when this part of Nunavut was volcanically active. In addition, it contains several crustal xenoliths including limestone and granite.

See also
Volcanism in Canada
List of volcanoes in Canada

References

Diatremes of Nunavut
Pre-Holocene volcanoes